Britt Herbots (born 24 September 1999) is a Belgian volleyball player. She plays for the Belgium women's volleyball team. Professionally, she plays for Italian Series A1 club Firenze.

Personal life
Herbots grew up in Sint-Truiden, Belgium. Her mother and father both coached volleyball.

International career

Clubs
 2014–2015 –  Topsportschool Vilvoorde
 2015–2017 –  Asterix Avo
 2017–2018 –  ASPTT Mulhouse
 2018–2020 –  Busto
 2020–2022 –  Novara
 2022–present –  Firenze

In 2015 at age 16, Herbots joined her country's top club of Asterix and within two seasons she won two Belgian Championship titles and two Cups, as well as a Supercup. After playing in France for one season, she began her career in Italy's top league when she signed with Busto. She named CEV Cup MVP.

National team
Herbots played for Belgium's youth national team and officially joined the senior national team in 2016 at 17 years old.

Herbots was statistically the best scorer at the 2021 FIVB Volleyball Women's Nations League tournament. Herbots scored 30 points or more in a single VNL match during the tournament four times. Herbots is also representing Belgium in the 2022 FIVB Volleyball Women's Nations League, and notably scored 31 points in a loss to Serbia.

Honors and awards

Club
 2015–2016 Belgian Super Cup –   Silver Medal, with Asterix Avo
 2015–2016 Belgian Cup –   Gold Medal, with Asterix Avo
 2015–2016 Belgian Liga A –  Champions, with Asterix Avo
 2016–2017 Belgian Super Cup –   Gold Medal, with Asterix Avo
 2016–2017 Belgian Cup –   Gold Medal, with Asterix Avo
 2016–2017 Belgian Liga A –  Champions, with Asterix Avo
 2017–2018 French Super Cup -  Gold Medal, with ASPTT Mulhouse
 2017–2018 French League -  Bronze Medal, with ASPTT Mulhouse
 2017–2018 French Cup -  Bronze Medal, with ASPTT Mulhouse
 2018–2019 CEV Cup –  Champions, with Busto
 2018–2019 Italian Cup –   Bronze Medal, with Busto
 2018–2019 Italian Cup –   Silver Medal, with Busto
 2020–2021 Italian Super Cup –   Bronze Medal, with Novara
 2020–2021 Italian Cup –   Silver Medal, with Novara
 2020–2021 CEV Champions League –   Bronze Medal, with Novara
 2020–2021 Italian Series A1 –   Silver Medal, with Novara
 2021–2022 Italian Super Cup –   Silver Medal, with Novara
 2021–2022 Italian Cup –   Silver Medal, with Novara
 2021–2022 Italian Series A1 –   Bronze Medal, with Novara

Individual
2015 Girls' Youth European Volleyball Championship – Best Opposite
2015 Girls' Youth European Volleyball Championship – Best Server
2015 European Youth Summer Olympic Festival – Most Valuable Player
2015–2016 Belgian Cup – Best Scorer
2015–2016 Belgian Cup – Best Spiker
2015–2016 Belgian Cup – Most Valuable Player
2015–2016 Belgian Cup – Best Opposite
2016–2017 Belgian Cup – Most Valuable Player
2016–2017 Belgian Cup – Best Scorer
2016–2017 Belgian Cup – Best Outside Hitter
2016–2017 Belgian Liga A – Most Valuable Player
2016–2017 Belgian Liga A – Best Scorer
2016–2017 Belgian Liga A – Best Outside Hitter
2017–2018 French Super Cup - Most Valuable Player
2017–2018 French League - Best Outside Hitter
2017–2018 French League - Most Valuable Player
2017–2018 French Cup - Best Outside Hitter
2018–19 CEV Cup – Most Valuable Player
2018–19 CEV Cup – Best Outside Hitter
2020 European Olympic Qualification – Best Server

References 

1999 births
Living people
Belgian women's volleyball players
Outside hitters
Opposite hitters
Serie A1 (women's volleyball) players
Expatriate volleyball players in Italy
Expatriate volleyball players in France
Sportspeople from Limburg (Belgium)
Belgian expatriate sportspeople in France
Belgian expatriate sportspeople in Italy